Psychagrapha is a genus of moths in the family Megalopygidae described by Francis Walker in 1855. The genus was established in the Psychidae, but was transferred to the Megalopygidae by David Stephen Fletcher and I. W. B. Nye in 1982.

Species
Psychagrapha floccosa Walker, 1855

References

External links

Megalopygidae
Megalopygidae genera